Highway 13 is an  long  two-lane route through the eastern part of Langley, British Columbia.  Highway 13 connects Washington state (via Washington State Route 539) to the central Fraser Valley.

Route description

Highway 13 begins at the Lynden–Aldergrove Border Crossing on the United States border as a continuation of Washington State Route 539, which travels south to Bellingham, Washington. The four-lane undivided highway brifely runs northwest before turning onto 264 Street, which it follows due north for  through a rural area of the Fraser Valley. Highway 13 then travels through the western outskirts of Aldergrove, a residential area within Langley Township, where it intersects the Fraser Highway. The highway continues north, passing Naval Radio Section Aldergrove and the Greater Vancouver Zoo, before reaching its northern terminus at an interchange with Highway 1 (part of the Trans-Canada Highway).

History
Historically, segments of Highway 13 were referred to as Townline, County Line and Howes roads. In 1932, the highway was selected as a "second artery" to connect Yale Road to the U.S. border. and was designated an arterial highway. The official title of  "Aldergrove-Bellingham Highway" came with the arterial designation.
 
In regard to the highway's number. The number 13 was assigned around 1953 to the road between the Lynden–Aldergrove Border Crossing and the present day Fraser Highway (former Highway 1A). The designation was pushed north to Highway 401, the new freeway alignment of the Trans-Canada Highway, by 1965.

The southern section of the highway near the U.S. border crossing was widened from 2018 to 2020 at a cost of $25.5 million, with funding from the provincial and national governments. The widened highway features two northbound lanes and three southbound lanes for trucks, NEXUS users, and other vehicles.

Major intersections
The entire route is in the Langley Township, Metro Vancouver.

References

External links

 Official Numbered Routes in British Columbia

013
1958 establishments in British Columbia